K. Mani Chandy may refer to:

 K. Mani Chandy (born 1944), an American computer scientist.
 K.M. Chandy (politician) (1921–1998), an Indian politician